Bourton is the name of more than one place in England:
 Bourton, Buckinghamshire
 Bourton, Dorset
 Bourton-on-the-Hill, Gloucestershire
 Bourton-on-the-Water, Gloucestershire
 Bourton, Cherwell, a civil parish in Oxfordshire
Great Bourton
 Bourton, Vale of White Horse, Oxfordshire (historically in Berkshire)
 Bourton, Shropshire
 Bourton, North Somerset
 Bourton on Dunsmore, Warwickshire
 Bourton, Wiltshire
 Flax Bourton, Somerset

See also 
Burton (disambiguation)